Kretzschau is a municipality in the Burgenlandkreis district, in southern Saxony-Anhalt, Germany. It is part of the Verbandsgemeinde Droyßiger-Zeitzer Forst. As of December 2020, its population is 2,409. On 1 January 2010 it absorbed the former municipalities Döschwitz and Grana.

References

Burgenlandkreis